Martin Putze (born 14 January 1985 in Apolda, Thuringia) is a German bobsledder who has competed since the early 2000s. Competing in two Winter Olympics, he won two medals in the four-man event with a gold in 2006 and a silver in 2010.

Putze also won four medals in the four-man event at the FIBT World Championships with two golds (2005, 2008), one silver (2009) and one bronze (2007).

References

External links
Bobsleigh four-man Olympic medalists for 1924, 1932–56, and since 1964
Bobsleigh four-man world championship medalists since 1930

1985 births
Living people
People from Apolda
German male bobsledders
Bobsledders at the 2006 Winter Olympics
Bobsledders at the 2010 Winter Olympics
Bobsledders at the 2014 Winter Olympics
Olympic bobsledders of Germany
Olympic gold medalists for Germany
Olympic silver medalists for Germany
Olympic medalists in bobsleigh
Medalists at the 2010 Winter Olympics
Medalists at the 2006 Winter Olympics
Sportspeople from Thuringia